Guy Anthony Woolfenden  (12 July 1937 – 15 April 2016) was an English composer and conductor.

Biography
Woolfenden was born in Ipswich and educated at Westminster Abbey Choir School, London, and Whitgift School, Croydon. He studied music at Christ's College in Cambridge and went on to study at the Guildhall School of Music and Drama. He joined the Royal Shakespeare Company in Stratford-upon-Avon in 1961 and was Head of Music from 1963 to 1998. He was Artistic Director of the Cambridge Festival from 1986 to 1991. In 1995 he was a founder director of the English Music Festival which became the Stratford on Avon Music Festival. He was the Chairman of the Denne Gilkes Memorial Fund, a charity which supports young musicians and actors. He was the founder of the publishing company, Ariel Music. Woolfenden married Jane Aldrick in 1962 and they had three sons.

Conducting and arranging
Woolfenden conducted three productions with the Scottish Opera, as well as the first British productions of Nielsen's Saul and David, Tchaikovsky's Maid of Orleans and Liszt's Don Sanche.

Composing
Woolfenden composed many pieces for wind bands, chamber ensembles and orchestral works, many of which have been recorded.

He composed around 150 scores for the Royal Shakespeare Company. He worked with many major European theatre companies, including the Comédie-Française, Paris; the Burgtheater, Vienna; the Teatro di Stabile, Genoa; and the Norwegian National Theatre, Oslo.

He also composed music for films such as Work Is a Four-Letter Word (1968) and the 1968 movie version of A Midsummer Night's Dream, as well as the 1974 television version of Antony and Cleopatra.

Awards
His 1977 musical adaptation of The Comedy of Errors won the Olivier Award for Best New Musical.

He was awarded the OBE for his services to music in the New Year Honours List in 2007.

References

External links
Ariel Music Website

1937 births
2016 deaths
20th-century classical composers
21st-century classical composers
English classical composers
Officers of the Order of the British Empire
People educated at Whitgift School
Alumni of the Guildhall School of Music and Drama
Alumni of Christ's College, Cambridge
Musicians from Ipswich
People educated at Westminster Abbey Choir School
English male classical composers
20th-century English composers
20th-century British male musicians
21st-century British male musicians
Presidents of the Independent Society of Musicians